Luye Township is a rural township in Taitung County, Taiwan. It is located in the Huadong Valley.

Geography

The township is located at the Huadong Valley.

Administrative divisions
 Luye Village
 Longtian Village
 Yong'an Village
 Ruilong Village
 Ruiyuan Village
 Ruihe Village
 Ruifeng Village

Economy
The government has been developing the township to be a major tea production area in east coast of Taiwan.

Tourist attractions
 Kunci Temple
 Luye Highlands
 Finland Stock House of Yung-an
 Flight Ground on Luye Stage
 Liyuan Farm
 Longtien Village
 Luye Stage Tourist Tea Garden
 Luye Steam Nourishing Health Hot Spring
 Shinliang's Water Park
 Thunder Fire Mud Volcano
 Two Level Ground's Moon World
 Wuling Green Tunnel

Transportation

 Provincial Highway 9
 Luye Station, Ruihe Station and Ruiyuan Station of TRA Taitung Line

References

Townships in Taitung County